Britto PM (born 15 March 1993) is an Indian professional footballer who plays as a winger for I-League club Rajasthan United. He also works in the Indian Navy, part of the Indian Armed Forces since 2014.

Career

Viva Kerala
In 2010, Kerala's lone representatives in I-League Viva Kerala FC, Signed Britto for their youth squad from U19 Kerala Team. Then after Viva Kerala became defunct, and signed for pune fc in 2011-12 Quartz SC signed Britto along with other players.

Indian Navy
In 2014, Britto joined Indian Navy the represented Services in 2014–15, 2015–16, 2016–17 seasons of Santosh Trophy(2 times champions) and 2015 National Games of India and Durand Cup as well performed ..

Mohun Bagan
In 2018, he signed for Mohun Bagan. He was also an integral part of the title winning Mohun Bagan team who won I league 2019–20.

Career statistics

Club

Honours

Club
Mohun Bagan
Calcutta Football League (1): 2018–19
Mohun Bagan
I league (1): 2019–20 Mohun Bagan A.C.
Santosh Trophy champions of 2015-16 for  services
Santosh Trophy champions of 2016-17 for services
Goa Football Association champions 2017-18 forChurchill Brothers FC Goa
Kerala Premier League champions for Indian Navy (football club)
 National Games medalist
 man of the match i league match 2022

References

1993 births
Living people
People from Thiruvananthapuram district
Indian footballers
Footballers from Kerala
I-League players
Association football forwards
Association football midfielders
Churchill Brothers FC Goa players
Mohun Bagan AC players
Pune FC players
Indian Super League players
NorthEast United FC players
Rajasthan United FC players